Tianjin Port Holdings Company Limited, formerly Tianjin Port Storage and Transportation Holdings Limited, is engaged in the operations of Tianjin Port, the warehousing and storage of cargo and the provision of freight forwarding and shipping brokerage services. It is parented by Tianjin Port (Group). Its A shares were listed on the Shanghai Stock Exchange in 1996. Its name was changed to Tianjin Port Holdings Company Limited in 1998.

See also 

Tianjin Port
Tianjin Port Development

References

External links
Tianjin Port Holdings Company Limited

Government-owned companies of China
Companies based in Tianjin
Companies established in 1992
Logistics companies of China
Companies listed on the Shanghai Stock Exchange
1992 establishments in China